Lindseth is a Norwegian surname. Notable people with the surname include:

Jonathan Lindseth (born 1996), Norwegian footballer
Ketil Lindseth (born 1977), Norwegian politician
Peter Lindseth (born 1962), American lawyer

Surnames of Scandinavian origin